Erich Graf von Kielmansegg (13 February 1847 – 5 February 1923) was an Austrian statesman. He served as stadtholder of Lower Austria and short time Cisleithanian Minister-President of Austria-Hungary in 1895.

Biography
He was born in Hanover the son of Count Eduard von Kielmansegg (1804–1879), Minister-President of the Kingdom of Hanover from 1855 to 1862 and himself a grandson of Lieutenant-General Johann Ludwig von Wallmoden-Gimborn, an illegitimate son of King George II of Great Britain with Amalie Sophie Marianne von Wendt and Juliane von Zesterfleth zu Bergfried (1808-1880). With his father he had to emigrate upon the annexation of Hanover by Prussia after the 1866 Austro-Prussian War and moved to Vienna. Kielmansegg studied Jurisprudence at the universities of Heidelberg and Vienna and entered the Austrian civil service in 1870.

From 1876 he served as Hauptmann (captain) of the Baden District, Austria and from 1882 as an official of the state governments in the Cisleithanian crown lands of Bukovina and Carinthia as well as in the Austrian Ministry of the Interior. From 17 October 1889 he was stadtholder of Lower Austria, where he carried through the union of Vienna with the suburbs (Greater Vienna), the Vienna Danube regulation and the expansion of the Donaukanal and the Wien River.

After Minister-President Prince Alfred III of Windisch-Grätz had resigned over the language conflict with the Young Czech Party in Bohemia, Kielmansegg, a confidant of Emperor Francis Joseph I of Austria, was appointed Minister of the Interior and Cisleithanian Prime Minister on 18 June 1895, though only as an acting officeholder until the implementation of the Badeni government on 29 September. He remained Lower Austrian governor until 18 June 1911, however, he had to cope with the rising political power of the Social Democrats and the Christian Social Party under the popular Vienna mayor Karl Lueger.

Personal life
He was married to Russian noblewoman Anastasia Lebedewna von Lebedeff (1860-1912). In August 1892 Countess Anastasia von Kielmannsegg allegedly took part in sword duel with Princess Pauline von Metternich over a floral arrangement at the Vienna Musical and Theater Exposition, which was later denied by the Princess as a "ridiculous invention by Italian journalists". The marriage between Erich and Anastasia remained childless.

Death
Retired Kielmansegg died in Vienna from pneumonia, he was buried at the Döbling Cemetery. A born North German he was, with the exception of Chancellor Count Friedrich Ferdinand von Beust, the only Protestant minister of Austria up to this date.

Notes

References

External links
 Ottův slovník naučný 
 Ottův slovník naučný nové doby 

1847 births
1923 deaths
Burials at Döbling Cemetery
19th-century Ministers-President of Austria
Nobility from Hanover
Ministers-President of Austria
Austrian Protestants
Counts of Austria
Governors of Lower Austria (to 1918)
Grand Crosses of the Order of Franz Joseph
Honorary Knights Grand Cross of the Royal Victorian Order